Starý Jičín is a municipality and village in Nový Jičín District in the Moravian-Silesian Region of the Czech Republic. It has about 2,900 inhabitants.

Administrative parts
Villages of Dub, Heřmanice, Janovice, Jičina, Palačov, Petřkovice, Starojická Lhota and Vlčnov are administrative parts of Starý Jičín.

Geography
It is located in the Moravian-Silesian Foothills.

History

The first written mention of Jičín is from 1240, when the castle was mentioned. The castle was built here in the late 12th or in the early 13th century, originally as a guard castle on the Amber Road. The nearby market village was established soon after the castle.

Sights
The landmark of the municipality is the Starý Jičín Castle on a hill above the village. For centuries, none of the owners cared about the castle and at the beginning of the 20th century, it became a ruin. Since 1996, it has been owned by the municipality and partial repairs were made.

The second monument is the complex of the parish Church of Saint Wenceslaus with a rebuilt Renaissance tower.

Notable people
Max David (1859–?), Moravian-German engineer

References

External links

Villages in Nový Jičín District